Egyptian Handball Professional Super Cup is an annual super cup competition for Egypt handball teams. Organized by the Egyptian Handball Federation, it was originally known as the Egyptian Professional Super Cup. It was the Fourth nationwide handball competition played in Egypt, with the first competition in 2019.

Titles by club

Winners by year
 The complete list of the Egyptian cup winners since 2019:

References

Handball competitions in Egypt
Recurring sporting events established in 2019